Depor may refer to one or more football (soccer) teams named Deportivo:

 Depor F.C., Cali, Colombia
 Deportivo Cali, Cali, Colombia
 Deportivo Pasto, Pasto, Colombia
 Deportivo de La Coruña, A Coruña, Galicia, Spain